"Deciphering Me" is artist/songwriter Brooke Fraser's sixth single, and her first single from her second studio album Albertine. The song debuted on the New Zealand Singles Chart at number forty on 23 October 2006 and on 4 December 2006, peaked at number four. It remained on the chart for a total of twenty two non-consecutive weeks, nine of them being in the top ten. The single includes two B-sides, a live piano backed version of the title track and a demo track, "Day Is Dimming". Both were recorded at Sony Studios in Sydney. Deciphering Me was performed live on the current affairs show Close Up on 1 December. During the preceding interview, Fraser stated that the song is about "vulnerability and trust". This was in fact one of presenter Susan Wood's last shows before her resignation due to health problems.

Music video

The music video for the single was directed by Anthony Rose. It took two days to shoot and was filmed in Tokyo, Japan, on 2 October 2006 and 3 October 2006. The music video depicts Fraser walking through late night Tokyo in the rain, backed by scenery of neon-lit buildings. She appears in such places as the Nishi-shinjuku business district, Shibuya Center-gai shopping area. One following scene shows Fraser on the Tokyo metropolitan train system. All the while as she does this, she holds a transparent umbrella and lip-synchs to her song. The final scenes show her return to her hotel building, climb the elevator and stand upon the roof.

Track listing

Charts

Notes and references

External links
Deciphering Me – watch "Deciphering Me" on YouTube.

2006 singles
APRA Award winners
Brooke Fraser songs
Songs written by Brooke Fraser
2006 songs
Columbia Records singles
Song recordings produced by Marshall Altman